Schechner is a German surname. Notable people with the surname include:

 Jacki Schechner, American television journalist
 Richard Schechner, American performing arts professor

See also
Tomer Shechner, Israeli psychologist
Schachner 

German-language surnames